"Banlieue Sale Music" is a song by French rapper La Fouine featuring fellow French rapper Nessbeal. It was released on 18 December 2009 by La Fouine's record label Banlieue Sale as the lead single from his fourth mixtape Capital du crime, Vol. 2, and peaked at number 15 on the Belgian Ultratip 50 Singles Chart in Wallonia.

Music video
A music video for the song was released on La Fouine's channel on YouTube on 21 December 2009.

Track listing
 Digital download
 "Banlieue Sale Music" (featuring Nessbeal) – 4:19

Chart performance

References

2009 singles
2009 songs
French hip hop songs
La Fouine songs
Nessbeal songs